Lake Puyallup developed along the south edge of the Puget Sound Glacier.  The glacier was in retreat northward after having reached its most southerly point.  Drainage off the north face of Mount Rainier and the melting ice of the glacier was trapped in the valley of the Puyallup River.  As the glacier moved north, the lake grew until it reached its largest capacity with the glacier at the glacial front across the Puyallup valley just south of Commencement Bay at Tacoma and northern bend of the White River at Auburn. When the ice retreated further north, it was reduced in depth and volume and takes on the name of Lake Tacoma.

The Ohop Channel
Lake Puyallup initial drain was south through the Ohop channel. The Ohop served as the drain for the Carbon and Puyallup rivers to the Nisqually. From Lake Kapowsin, the valley of Ohop Creek, through Ohop Lake to the Nisqually.
West of this was the low land draining towards Lake Russell, thus blocking this westward drain. This remained the outflow until the glacier retreated further north, opening a new lower channel at Clover Creek.

See also
Glacial Lake Russell

References

Skokomish
Skokomish
Pierce County, Washington
King County, Washington
Thurston County, Washington
Geography of Washington (state)
Puyallup